Marjane (also Marjane Holding) is a Moroccan hypermarket chain. It is wholly owned by Al Mada holding company. The chain opened its first supermarket, in 1990, in Rabat.

In 2008, the company had 33 hypermarkets around Morocco. Its total turnover in 2007 was 6.78 billion Dirhams and employs 5,144 people. With more than 18 million customers per annum (2007), Marjane is the leader on the Moroccan market in front of the hypermarket Metro AG Morocco and Aswak Assalam, its principal competitors.

Other Activities
In addition to Acima, Marjane holding also owns Electroplanet and Tikki, respectively a home appliances chain and a clothing outlet. It also intends on launching its fast fashion chain in the upcoming mall of the new city of Zenata.

Locations

Casablanca – Settat (9)
 Hyper Casablanca – Californie (1993 – 6500 m2)
 Hyper Casablanca – Ain Sebaa (2000 – 8500 m2)
 Hyper Casablanca – Derb Soultane (2005 – 10000 m2)
 Hyper Casablanca – Hay Hassani (2007 – 8300 m2)
 Hyper Casablanca – Morocco Mall (2011 – 7222 m2)
 Hyper Casablanca – Sidi Othman (2014 – 6500 m2)
 Hyper Casablanca – Tachfine Center (2016 – 19000 m2 – Shopping mall)
 Hyper Casablanca – Marina  (2019 )
 Hyper Mohammédia (2003 – 7200 m2)
 Hyper El Jadida (2013 – 6840 m2)

Rabat – Salé – Kenitra (5)
 Hyper Rabat – Bouregreg (1990 – 5200 m2) 
 Hyper Rabat – Hay Riad (2000 – 8500 m2)
 Hyper Kénitra (2007 – 7500 m2)
 Hyper Salé – Tabriquet (2011 – 13080 m2)
 Hyper Sidi Slimane – (2013 – 3770 m2)

Tanger – Tétouan – Al Hoceima (5)
 Hyper Tanger – Madina (2002 – 6500 m2)
 Hyper Tanger – Al Ikhlass (2009 – 6571 m2)
 Hyper Tétouan (2004 – 5200 m2)
 Hyper Larache (2013 – 4177 m2)
 Hyper Al Hoceima (2013 – 2600 m2)

Oriental (4)
 Hyper Oujda – Angad (2007 – 6500 m2)
 Hyper Saïdia – Medina Mall (2009 – 3200 m2)
 Hyper Nador (2009 – 6571 m2)
 Hyper Berkane  (2013 – 3680 m2)

Beni Mellal – Khenifra (3)
 Hyper Béni Mellal (2010 – 4500 m2)
 Hyper Khouribga (2010 – 6500 m2)
 Hyper Fquih Ben Salah (2012 – 2830 m2)

Marrakech – Safi (4)
 Hyper Marrakech – Ménara (1999 – 9900 m2)
 Hyper Marrakech – Massira (2006 – 6500 m2)
 Hyper Safi (2007 – 6500 m2)
 Hyper El Kelaa des Sraghna (2011 – 2138 m2)

Fès – Meknès (5)
 Hyper Fès – Agdal (2001 – 6400 m2)
 Hyper Fès – Saîss (2009 – 6800 m2)
 Hyper Meknès – Route Agouraï (2005 – 5500 m2)
 Hyper Meknès – Hamria (2013 – 5500 m2)
 Hyper Taza (2012 – 2600 m2)

Souss – Massa (2)
 Hyper Agadir – Founty (2001 – 8000 m2)
 Hyper Inezgane (2014 – 6540 m2)

Sahara (1)
 Hyper Guelmim (2014 – 3000 m2)

Upcoming hypermarkets
 Extension Hyper Khouribga (already done)
 Hyper Rabat Center (already done)
 Hyper Laayoune
 Hyper Ouarzazate
 Hyper Youssoufia

References

External links
Marjane.co.ma

Supermarkets of Morocco
Retail companies established in 1990
Retail companies of Morocco
Société Nationale d'Investissement
Moroccan brands
ONA Group
1990 establishments in Morocco